The Lodge family is a formerly prominent New England political family, and among the families who make up the "Boston Brahmins", also known as the "first families of Boston".

History
The Boston Brahmin Lodge family are closely related with the Cabot family. George Cabot had a great-granddaughter named Anna Cabot (b. 1821), who married the wealthy Boston merchant John Ellerton Lodge. Their son Henry Cabot Lodge (b. 1850 in Boston) was a U.S. Senator from Massachusetts, who was reelected for the same senate seat as the incumbent 1916 U.S. Senate candidate against the Kennedy brothers' maternal grandfather, John F. Fitzgerald. The senator's grandson, Henry Cabot Lodge II (b. 1902 in Nahant) was also a U.S. Senator from Massachusetts, incumbent 1952 U.S. Senate candidate from Massachusetts against John F. Kennedy, U.S. Ambassador to United Nations, and 1960 vice presidential candidate for Richard Nixon against the Kennedy–Johnson ticket. Another grandson, John Davis Lodge (b. 1903 in Washington, D.C.), was the 64th Governor of Connecticut. The son of Henry Cabot Lodge II, George Cabot Lodge II (b. 1927), was the 1962 U.S. Senate candidate from Massachusetts against Ted Kennedy.

It became connected to other prominent families through marriage.

Notable members
 John Ellerton Lodge (b. 1807), married Anna Cabot (b. 1821).
 Henry Cabot Lodge I (b. 1850 in Boston), U.S. Senator from Massachusetts and ardent opponent of Woodrow Wilson’s League of Nations
 George Cabot Lodge I (b. 1873 in Boston), poet
 Henry Cabot Lodge II (b. 1902 in Nahant), U.S. Senator from Massachusetts, incumbent 1952 U.S. Senate candidate from Massachusetts against John F. Kennedy, U.S. Ambassador to United Nations, and 1960 vice presidential candidate for Richard Nixon against the Kennedy–Johnson ticket
 George Cabot Lodge II (b. 1927), Harvard Business School professor, 1962 U.S. Senate candidate from Massachusetts against Ted Kennedy
 Henry Sears Lodge (b. 1930)
 John Davis Lodge (b. 1903 in Washington, D.C.), 64th Governor of Connecticut
 Lily Lodge

References

 
American families of English ancestry
Families from Massachusetts
Political families of the United States